Koker is a village in Rostamabad, Gilan Iran. 
Koker is a small mud-brick village which became famous through three films made by Abbas Kiarostami known as "Koker Trilogy". 
In the early 1990s the well-known Koker trilogy of films, directed by Abbas Kiarostami, were filmed in the village, which was devastated by the 1990 earthquake.

Populated places in Gilan Province